This is a list of Argentine films of 2013

Films
Argentina
2013